Women's +78 kg category in judo at the 2012 Olympic Games in London took place at the ExCeL Exhibition Centre between 28 July and 3 August.

The gold and silver medals were determined by a single-elimination tournament, with the winner of the final taking gold and the loser receiving silver. Judo events awarded two bronze medals. Quarter-final losers competed in a repechage match for the right to face a semi-final loser for a bronze medal (that is, the judokas defeated in quarter-finals 'A' and 'B' competed against each other, with the winner of that match facing the semi-final loser from the other half of the bracket).

Idalys Ortiz from Cuba won the gold medal, defeating Mika Sugimoto from Japan in the final. Bronze medals were awarded to both Karina Bryant from Great Britain and Tong Wen from China.

Schedule 
All times are British Summer Time (UTC+1)

Results

Finals

Repechages

Pool A

Pool B

Pool C

Pool D

References

External links
 

W79
Judo at the Summer Olympics Women's Heavyweight
Olympics W79
Women's events at the 2012 Summer Olympics